is a Japanese singer, songwriter, rapper, and record producer. She began creating and releasing music onto Nico Nico Douga and YouTube in 2012, achieving recognition for writing and performing viral Vocaloid songs. She released the album Gokusaishiki independently, which reached the top ten on the Oricon Albums Chart.

Reol signed with the record label Toy's Factory in 2015, and in 2016, she formed the J-pop group REOL, composed of her long-time collaborators GigaP and Okiku, where she served as both its namesake and lead vocalist. Their debut album, Sigma, was released the same year to widespread success and acclaim, peaking at 6 on the Oricon Albums Chart, and 9 on the Billboard Japan Hot 100. In 2017, the group announced they intended to disband, and after their final live performance, they released the extended play Endless EP before officially disbanding.

Following the disbandment of REOL, Reol signed with Victor Entertainment in 2018, resuming her career as a solo artist and releasing the album Jijitsujo that same year. Giga-P still frequently collaborates with her as a producer, and Okiku has continued to contribute to live visuals and some music videos. Her following singles have received general commercial and viral success, and with both her rise to solo prominence and the release of her 2020 album Kinjitou, she was the first Japanese performer to be named "Artist on the Rise" by YouTube in 2020.

Career
In late 2012, Reol began uploading original songs and cover songs to video sharing sites Nico Nico Douga and YouTube. On August 17, 2014, Reol co-released the compilation album titled No Title+ with music arranger GigaP, video director Okiku, and art producer Key, under the group name Anyosupenyosuyaya. The album contains vocals by Vocaloid virtual singers such as Hatsune Miku, GUMI and Megurine Luka, the album was released through Japanese label Celo Project. Reol has since released a version with her own vocals, titled No Title-. In 2014, Reol released the single "LUVORATORRRRRY!" in collaboration with Nqrse, GigaP and Okiku. The music video for the song has amassed over 72 million views on YouTube, making it their most popular release.

On July 29, 2015, Reol independently released her first studio album titled Gokusaishiki, which reached the top ten on the Oricon Albums Chart. Later in 2015, Reol, along with GigaP & Okiku, signed with Toy's Factory under the unit name REOL. On August 18, REOL made their first public appearance in the music video for their single "Give me a break Stop now". They released their debut studio album titled 'Sigma' on October 19, 2016, which reached number 8 on the Oricon weekly Albums Chart. In August 2017, REOL announced that they would be disbanding after their last live performances. On October 11, 2017, REOL released their final project, which was an EP entitled Endless EP.

In January 2018, Reol signed to Victor Entertainment. On March 5 she released a music video for the song titled "エンド" as the single for her solo debut EP. Reol released her first EP titled Kyokoushu on March 14. Reol released the singles "Saisaki" and "Sairen" in July and August respectively before the announcement of her first studio album Jijitsujo. Jijitsujo was released on October 17, and a music video for the third single "Gekihaku" was released on December 19. Reol was featured on TeddyLoid's Silent Planet:Infinity album on the song "Winners". Reol later went on her first tour dubbed "MADE IN FACTION" around Japan, and later into China.

In 2019, she released the Bunmei EP on March 20, and music videos for "Utena" and "Lost Paradise" respectively. She has gone on her second Japanese tour, named "Reol Secret Live". "Phanto(me)" was released on July 24, 2019 as a single.

On 22 January 2020, Reol released her second full album Kinjitou. The album has a total of 11 songs and includes the digital singles: Phanto(me), HYPE MODE, and 1LDK. On September 27, 2020, she, as the first Japanese female artist, was elected in "Artist on the Rise". On July 29, the music video for "The Sixth Sense" was released, a promotional song for Boat Race 2020, which also featured the group Tokyo Gegegay, who also sang in the YouTube version. On November 4, she released a music video titled "Q?", in collaboration with GigaP.

In October 2021, she released her extended play Dai Rokkan, which additionally featured "The Sixth Sense".

In May 2022, Reol signed to Sony Music Japan.

Discography

Albums

Studio albums

Video albums

Extended plays

Singles

Notes

References

1993 births
Living people
Japanese women singer-songwriters
Japanese singer-songwriters
Japanese rappers
Japanese record producers
21st-century Japanese women singers
21st-century Japanese singers
Utaite
Musicians from Nagano Prefecture